The UK Cyber Security Council is the self-regulatory body for the UK cyber security profession, tasked by the UK Government with "the development of a framework that speaks across the different specialisms, setting out a comprehensive alignment of career pathways, including the certifications and qualifications required within certain levels. The Council will lay the structural foundations of the cyber security profession that will enable it to respond to the evolving needs of industry and the wider economy."

History

In November 2016, the UK Government's National Cyber Security Strategy 2016-2021 policy paper set out "the UK Government’s plan to make Britain secure and resilient in cyberspace". It included ambitions to develop and accredit the cyber security profession by "reinforcing the recognised body of cyber security excellence within the industry and providing a focal point which can advise, shape and inform national policy."

In December 2018, the Government's Initial National Cyber Security Skills Strategy policy paper described an ambition for a new, independent body, named as the UK Cyber Security Council.

In August 2019 the Department for Digital, Culture, Media and Sport (DCMS) appointed the Institution of Engineering and Technology (IET) as the lead organisation in charge of designing and delivering the new UK Cyber Security Council, alongside 15 other cyber security professional organisations collectively known as the Cyber Security Alliance. The council will be "charged with the development of a framework that speaks across the different specialisms, setting out a comprehensive alignment of career pathways, including the certifications and qualifications required within certain levels."

In February 2021, the Department for Digital, Culture, Media and Sport confirmed in a statement that the launch of the council is scheduled for the end of March 2021.

On March 31, 2021, a press release announced that the Government-mandated Council had officially become an independent entity.

See also
 National Cyber Security Centre (United Kingdom)

References

External links

Official website

Information technology organisations based in the United Kingdom